The Commissioner of the London Fire Brigade, previously known as the Chief Fire Officer until c. 2000, is the head of the London Fire Brigade. Andy Roe has held the post since January 2020.

The rank is usually referred to as the London Fire Brigade Commissioner, the LFB Commissioner or simply "Commissioner".

Current Commissioner 
Since January 2020, Andy Roe has held the role of Commissioner of the London Fire Brigade; he previously served as Deputy Commissioner.

Before joining the London Fire Brigade in 2002 as a firefighter, he served as an officer in the British Army.

Andy Roe was also operational commander during the Grenfell Tower Fire. He revoked the controversial "stay put" policy set by the previous LFB Commissioner Dany Cotton.

List of London Fire Brigade chief officers and commissioners

References